The 1995 NCAA Division III football season, part of the college football season organized by the NCAA at the Division III level in the United States, began in August 1995, and concluded with the NCAA Division III Football Championship, also known as the Stagg Bowl, in December 1995 at Salem Football Stadium in Salem, Virginia. The Wisconsin–La Crosse Eagles won their second Division III championship by defeating the Rowan Profs, 36−7. The Gagliardi Trophy, given to the most outstanding player in Division III football, was awarded to Chris Palmer, wide receiver from St. John's (MN).

Conference changes and new programs

Conference standings

Conference champions

Postseason
The 1995 NCAA Division III Football Championship playoffs were the 23rd annual single-elimination tournament to determine the national champion of men's NCAA Division III college football. The championship Stagg Bowl game was held at Salem Football Stadium in Salem, Virginia for the second time. Salem remained the yearly host of the Stagg Bowl until 2017, with the game moving to Shenandoah, Texas in 2018 and 2019. Like the previous ten tournaments, this year's bracket featured sixteen teams.

Playoff bracket

See also
1995 NCAA Division I-A football season
1995 NCAA Division I-AA football season
1995 NCAA Division II football season

References